Zavadiv – village (selo) in the Stryi Raion, Lviv Oblast (province) of Western Ukraine. It belongs to Stryi urban hromada, one of the hromadas of Ukraine. The first written mention dates back to the year 1504.
Local government is administered by Zavadivska village council. The population of the village is just about 1197 people.

Geography 
It is located near the village  Holobutiv.

Personalities and sights 
The village has of monumental art sights of local importance.
 Taras Shevchenko monument (stone, 1914 – 1916) (N864).
 Ostap Nyzhankivsky monument (marble chips, bronze, 1989) (N1719)
 Ivan Franko monument (marble chips, bronze, 1989) (N1721)
 Taras Shevchenko monument (marble chips, bronze, 1989) (N1723)

Ostap Nyzhankivsky lived for a time in the village Zavadiv. He was initiator the construction and opening of the monument to Taras Shevchenko. Taras Shevchenko monument built in the village in 1916. It is the oldest monument to Taras Shevchenko, where the poet is depicted in the full size.

Gallery

References

External links 
 Завадів, Стрийський район, Львівська область 
 weather.in.ua

Literature 
 

Villages in Stryi Raion